Galaktoboureko is a Greek, Turkish, Laz, and Syrian dessert of semolina custard baked in filo. Turkish Laz böreği is made with a type of pudding called muhallebi instead of semolina custard. It is popular in Rize and Artvin provinces in the Black Sea Region, indigenous home of Laz people.

Preparation
It is served or coated with a clear, sweet syrup. The custard may be flavored with lemon, orange, or rose. Unlike mille-feuille, which it otherwise resembles, the custard is baked with the pastry, not added afterwards.

Laz böreği

Turkish Laz böreği is made with a variation of the pudding called muhallebi with the inclusion of cornmeal and ground black pepper, instead of semolina custard. It is popular in Rize and Artvin provinces in the Black Sea Region, indigenous Laz land. Its ingredients are thin filo dough, butter, muhallebi, black pepper and simple syrup. Today, it's possible to eat Laz böreği at some restaurants in big cities which serve traditional dishes from the Black Sea region.

See also
 Laz people
 Bougatsa
 Baklava
 Şöbiyet

References

External links
Recipe for Galaktoboureko on Wikibooks

Custard desserts
Cypriot cuisine
Greek pastries
Turkish pastries
Semolina dishes